The Catalonia Offensive was part of the Spanish Civil War.  The Nationalist Army started the offensive on 23 December 1938 and rapidly conquered Republican-held Catalonia with Barcelona (the Republic's capital city from October 1937). Barcelona was captured on 26 January 1939. The Republican government headed for the French border. Thousands of people fleeing the Nationalists also crossed the frontier in the following month, to be placed in internment camps. Franco closed the border with France by 10 February 1939.

Background
After its defeat at the Battle of the Ebro the Republican Army was broken and would never recover. The Republicans had lost most of their armament and experienced units. Furthermore, in October 1938 the Republican government agreed to withdraw the volunteers of the International Brigades. On the other hand, the Nationalists received new supplies of ammunition, weapons and aircraft from Germany. Furthermore, after the Munich Agreement, the hope of an intervention of the Western democracies in order to aid the Republic against Germany and Italy vanished. France had closed the frontier again in mid-June 1938 and frozen Republican financial assets in French banks.

Opposing forces

Nationalists
At the beginning of December, the nationalist faction concentrated an Army Group, the Army of the North, of 300,000–340,000 men led by the general Fidel Dávila in order to conquer Catalonia. The Nationalists assembled their best divisions all along the front from the Pyrenees to the Mediterranean. Along the Segre the Nationalists deployed Muñoz Grandes's Army of Urgel, Garcia Valiño's Army of Maestrazgo and Moscardo's Aragon Army; in the confluence of the Segre with the Ebro Gambara's Italian Cuerpo Legionario Italiano of four divisions (55,000 men) and Solchaga's Army Corps of Navarra; and in the Ebro the Yagüe's Moroccan Corps. The Nationalists also had, according to Beevor, 300 tanks, more than 500 aircraft (among them the Bf 109E and Heinkel 112 fighters) and 1,400 cannon.

Republicans

Opposing the Nationalists, the Republicans had Colonel Perea's East Army and Colonel Juan Modesto's Ebro Army under the command of General Juan Hernandez Saravia, commander of the Oriental Region's Army Group, with 220,000–300,000 men, many unarmed (Hernandez Saravia said that the Republican army had only 17,000 rifles for all Catalonia), 106 airplanes (most of them Chatos), 250 cannons and 40 tanks (many of them unserviceable due to shortage of spare parts). The Soviet government agreed to send to Catalonia a shipment of 250 aircraft, 250 tanks and 650 cannons, but the shipment did not reach Bordeaux until 15 January and only a small part of it crossed the border. Furthermore, because of the international isolation of the Republic and the lack of food (according to Beevor, in Barcelona the ration per day was down to 100 grams of lentils) the morale of the government troops and civil population in the Republican zone was very low. The people only wished the end of the war: "...just let it be over, it doesn’t matter how it ends, but let it end now."

Battle

Nationalist offensive
The Nationalist offensive was planned for 10 December but was postponed to 23 December. On 23 December the Italians and the Navarreses crossed the Segre at Mequinenza, broke the Republican lines, and advanced sixteen kilometres, but they were stopped by the V and XV Republican corps led by Lister on 25 December. On the left flank, Muñoz Grandes and Garcia Valiño advanced towards Cervera and Artesa, but they were blocked by the 26th Republican Division. On the south, Yagüe's troops were held back by the Ebro's floodwater. The Republicans had stopped the first Nationalist attack; nevertheless, they had lost 40 aircraft in the first ten days of the battle.

On 3 January Solchaga attacked Les Borges Blanques, Muñoz Grandes and Garcia Valiño occupied Artesa, and Yagüe crossed the Ebro. Moscardo attacked from Lleida and the Italians occupied Les Borges Blanques on 5 January. The same day, the Republican army started a surprise attack in Extremadura towards Peñarroya in order to divert Nationalist forces, but the offensive was halted after a few days and the Nationalist offensive in Catalonia continued. On 9 January the Moscardo's Aragon Army Corps joined Gambara at Mollerusa and broke the northern part of the front. The V and XV Republican Corps collapsed and retreated in disorder. On 15 January the Aragon and Maestrazgo Corps conquered Cervera and the Moroccan Corps after a one-day march of 50 km occupied Tarragona. By this day, the Nationalists had conquered a third of Catalonia, had taken 23,000 prisoners, and had killed 5,000 Republican soldiers.

Fall of Barcelona
The Republican government then attempted to organize a defense of Barcelona, ordering the general mobilization of all men to forty-five and militarized all the industry. Nevertheless, the successive defensive lines (L1, L2, L3) fell, the Republican forces were outnumbered six to one and the Nationalist air force bombed Barcelona every day (40 times between 21 and 25 January). It became clear that the defense of the city was impossible. On 22 January Solchaga and Yagüe reached the Llobregat only a few miles west of Barcelona, Muñoz Grandes and Garcia Valiño attacked Sabadell and Terrassa, and Gambara advanced to Badalona. The chief of staff of the Republican Army, Rojo told the Republican prime minister Negrín that the front had ceased to exist so the government abandoned Barcelona after releasing most of its prisoners. A large part of the Barcelona population fled from the city as well. On 24 January Garcia Valiño occupied Manresa, and on 25 January the Nationalist vanguard occupied the Tibidabo in the outskirts of Barcelona. The Nationalists finally occupied Barcelona on 26 January and there were five days of looting by the Yagüe's Regulares and extrajudicial killings (paseos).

Retreat
After the occupation of Barcelona, the Nationalist troops, tired from the long marches, slowed their advance but soon resumed their offensive, pursuing the retreating columns of Republican soldiers and civilians. On 1 February Negrín proposed, in the last meeting of the Cortes in the Figueres Castle, capitulation with the sole condition of respecting the lives of the vanquished and the holding of a plebiscite so the Spanish people could decide the form of government, but Franco did not accept. On 2 February the Nationalists entered Girona, arrived within 50 kilometers of the frontier on 3 February, occupied Figueres on 8 February and Rojo ordered the Republican troops to withdraw to the French frontier. Hundreds of thousands of Republican soldiers, women, children and old men marched to the French frontier on foot and on carts, buses and trucks through bitterly cold sleet and snow. Their retreat was covered by units of the Republican Army, which carried out hit and run attacks and ambushes. The Nationalist air force and the Condor Legion bombed and strafed the roads leading to France. On 28 January the French government announced that civilians could cross the frontier and, on 5 February, the Republican soldiers as well. Between 400,000 and 500,000, Republican refugees crossed the frontier, among them the president of the Republic (Manuel Azaña), the prime minister (Juan Negrín) and the chief of staff of the Republican Army (Vicente Rojo), as well the president of Catalonia (Lluís Companys) and the members of the Catalan government. Negrín returned to Spain on 9 February but Azaña and Rojo refused to return. By 9 February the Nationalists reached the frontier, and on the following day the last units of Modesto's Army of the Ebro crossed into France and the Nationalists sealed the frontier.

Aftermath

Military and political consequences

With the fall of Catalonia, the Republic lost the second largest city of the country, the Catalan war industry and a large part of its army (more than 200,000 soldiers). On 2 February Azaña resigned and the same day France and the United Kingdom recognized the Francoist government. Further military resistance became impossible and the war was lost for the Republic, despite the fact that 30% of Spain was still under Republican control after the offensive and Prime Minister Juan Negrín insisted that the Republic could continue to resist.

The Catalonia autonomy was abolished. The Catalan language, the Sardana and Catalan Christian names were forbidden. All Catalan newspapers were requisitioned and the forbidden books retired and burned. Even the inscriptions on tombs in the Montjuïc Cemetery commemorating Durruti, Ascaso and Ferrer i Guardia were removed.

Fate of the Republican refugees
The Republican exiles were interned in fifteen improvised camps (mostly barbed-wire enclosures on the sand, without basic shelter, sanitary or cooking facilities) by the French government in places such as Argelès, Gurs, Rivesaltes and Vernet. The living conditions in the camps were very harsh: in the first six months, 14,672 refugees died from malnutrition or dysentery. The French government encouraged the refugees to return and, by the end of 1939, between 70,000 and 180,000 refugees returned to Spain. However, 300,000 never returned. Many sought asylum in other countries: the Soviet Union (between 3,000 and 5,000), USA and Canada (about 1,000), Great Britain, Belgium and other European countries (between 3,000 and 5,000) and Latin America (30,000 to Mexico, 10,000 to Argentina, 5,000 to Venezuela, 5,000 to Dominican Republic, 3,500 to Chile, etc.). Nevertheless, at least 140,000 refugees remained in France while 19,000 went to the French colonies of North Africa. After the fall of France 10,000–15,000 refugees were detained by the Nazis and deported to concentration camps. Another 10,000 joined the French Resistance and more than 2,000 joined the Free French Forces.

See also
Eastern Region Army Group (GERO)
Camp de concentration d'Argelès-sur-Mer
List of Spanish Nationalist military equipment of the Spanish Civil War
List of weapons of the Corpo Truppe Volontarie
Condor Legion
Camí de la Retirada

Notes

Sources
  
 
 
 
 
 

Conflicts in 1938
Conflicts in 1939
1938 in Spain
1939 in Spain
Battles of the Spanish Civil War
20th century in Catalonia
December 1938 events
January 1939 events
February 1939 events